are tiered boxes used to hold and present food in Japan. The boxes are often used to hold osechi, foods traditional to the Japanese New Year, or to hold takeaway lunches, or bento.

There is also , a kind of chinese styled bowl, some stackable like jūbako.

Gallery

See also
Tiffin carrier: tiered lunchbox of India and the Caribbean

References

External links

Food packaging